Teddy Bass Presents El Dorado Driven is the thirteenth solo studio album by American hip hop recording artist Kool Keith. It was released on November 4, 2014 via Adhoksaja Records under exclusive license to Vancouver-based indie label Volunteer Media. Its audio production was entirely handled by Teddy Bass, and featured guest appearances from Denis Deft, Lord Diamonds, Michael Rushden, Sadat X, and Thirstin Howl III.

A music video for "Woman You The Best" was directed by Stuey Kubrick and released on October 30, 2014.

Track listing

Personnel
Keith Matthew Thornton - vocals, executive producer
Teddy Bass - producer, executive producer
Weezl - scratches
Kurt Matlin - mastering
Derek Murphy - vocals (track 3)
Victor DeJesus - vocals (track 3)
Robert Karl Edward Koch - vocals (track 5)
Michael J Gilbert - vocals (track 5)
Denis Martinez - vocals (track 12)
MIKE - artwork

References

External links

2014 albums
Kool Keith albums